Galla Rock (also known as “Galley Rock”) is an unincorporated community in Wilson Township, Pope County, Arkansas, United States. It was a thriving city in late 1700 and early 1800s, but is now reduced to a “city of the dead” according to an information plaque at the Galla Rock cemetery.

References 

Unincorporated communities in Pope County, Arkansas
Unincorporated communities in Arkansas